Jarosław Rodzewicz (born 11 May 1973) is a Polish fencer. He won a silver medal in the team foil event at the 1996 Summer Olympics.

References

External links
 

1973 births
Living people
Polish male fencers
Olympic fencers of Poland
Fencers at the 1996 Summer Olympics
Olympic silver medalists for Poland
Olympic medalists in fencing
Sportspeople from Gdynia
Medalists at the 1996 Summer Olympics
21st-century Polish people
20th-century Polish people